Dracophyllum townsonii is a species of shrub or small tree endemic to the north of New Zealand's South Island. It was first described by Thomas Cheeseman in 1906 and gets the specific epithet townsonii after the chemist and plant collector William Townson. In the heath family Ericaceae, it inhabits mountain slopes and reaches a height of 3–6 m.

References

Notes

Citations 

townsonii
Endemic flora of New Zealand
Plants described in 1906